Alojz Geržinič (11 June 1915 – 26 March 2008) is a Slovenian composer. Many of his compositions are for voice. A native of Ljubljana, he lived and worked in Buenos Aires, Argentina from 1948 until his death in 2008.

Composing opus

Vocal compositions 
Villancico for mixed choir (1979)
Loški zvon for mixed choir
Ave Maria for women choir
Dona primavera for women choir
Rad bi še živel for women trio and bariton (1965).

Vocal-instrumental compositions 
Una vieja historia for women trio and piano (1967)
Lo que vos querais, señor for women duo and piano (1979)
Dedek Samonog for vocal and piano (1975)
Poletna noč I for vocal and piano (1988)
Poletna noč II for vocal and piano (1988)

Instrumental solo compositions 
Fantazija for piano (1967)

See also
List of Slovenian composers

1915 births
2008 deaths
Slovenian composers
Male composers
Musicians from Ljubljana
Slovenian non-fiction writers
Slovenian editors
Slovenian educators
Yugoslav emigrants to Argentina
20th-century non-fiction writers
Musicians from Buenos Aires
Slovenian male musicians